Papyrus 101 (in the Gregory-Aland numbering), designated by 𝔓101, is an early copy of the New Testament in Greek. It is a papyrus manuscript of the Gospel of Matthew. The surviving texts of Matthew are verses 3:10-12; 3:16-4:3, they are in a fragmentary condition. The manuscript palaeographically has been assigned to the 3rd century.

 Text
The Greek text of the codex is a representative of the Alexandrian text-type.

 Location
The manuscript is currently housed at the Sackler Library (Papyrology Rooms, P. Oxy. 4401) at Oxford.

Textual Variants 

 3:10: εις (into) becomes προς (towards).
 3:11: omits οπισω μου (after me).
 3:11: βαστασαι (to bear) is changed to λυσαι (to untie). The missing space on the line above could also include κυφας (bending down), therefore almost conforming the text to the same as Mark 1:7.
 3:16: ωσαι (as if it were) becomes ως (like).
 3:16: και (and) is omitted from after περιστεραν (dove).
 3:17: ευδοκησα (well pleased) becomes ηυδοκησα, a variant spelling.
 4:2: ημερας τεσσερακοντα και νυκτας τεσσερακοντα (days forty and nights forty) becomes μ ημερας και μ νυκτας (forty days and forty nights (the numeral μ representing "forty")).

See also 

 List of New Testament papyri

References

Further reading 

 J. David Thomas, The Oxyrhynchus Papyri LXIV (London: 1997), pp. 2–4.

External links

Images 
 P.Oxy.LXIV 4401 from Papyrology at Oxford's "POxy: Oxyrhynchus Online" 
 𝔓101 recto 3:10-12
 𝔓101 verso 3:16-4:3

Official registration 
 "Continuation of the Manuscript List" Institute for New Testament Textual Research, University of Münster. Retrieved April 9, 2008

New Testament papyri
3rd-century biblical manuscripts
Early Greek manuscripts of the New Testament
Gospel of Matthew papyri